Scott is the name of several places in the U.S. state of Wisconsin:
Scott, Brown County, Wisconsin, a town
Scott, Burnett County, Wisconsin, a town
Scott, Columbia County, Wisconsin, a town
Scott, Crawford County, Wisconsin, a town
Scott, Lincoln County, Wisconsin, a town
Scott, Monroe County, Wisconsin, a town
Scott, Sheboygan County, Wisconsin, a town